The Vacancy is a 1981 Soviet comedy film directed by Margarita Mikaelyan.

Plot 
The film tells about a young honest and married man, the nephew of an influential uncle, who does not use his advantageous position.

Cast 
 Leonid Kayurov
 Rolan Bykov
 Oleg Tabakov
 Viktor Proskurin
 Yekaterina Vasilyeva
 Marina Yakovleva
 Tatyana Dogileva		
 Vera Ivleva

References

External links 
 

1981 films
1981 comedy films
Films scored by Gennady Gladkov
1980s Russian-language films
Soviet comedy films